Alan Raymond Loveday (29 February 1928 – 12 April 2016) was a New Zealand violinist. A child prodigy, he became leader of the Royal Philharmonic Orchestra, and a soloist and leader with the Academy of St Martin in the Fields. He was a professor at the Royal College of Music for 17 years from 1955. Loveday married pianist Ruth Stanfield in 1952, and they had two children, including Ian Loveday.

References

1928 births
2016 deaths
People from Palmerston North
New Zealand emigrants to England
New Zealand expatriates in England
New Zealand violinists
Male violinists
Academics of the Royal College of Music